Gliese 3323 (GJ 3323, also known as LHS 1723) is a nearby single star located in the equatorial constellation Eridanus, about 0.4° to the northwest of the naked eye star Psi Eridani. It is invisible to the naked eye with an apparent visual magnitude 12.20. Parallax measurements give a distance estimate of 17.5 light years from the Sun. It is drifting further away with a radial velocity of +42.3 km/s. Roughly 104,000 years ago, the star is believed to have come to within  of the Solar System.

The stellar classification of Gliese 3323 is M4.0Ve, indicating that it is a red dwarf, with emission lines appearing in its spectrum. It is fully convective and a source of X-ray emission. The star has 17% of the Sun's mass, 19% of the radius of the Sun, and just 0.4% of the Sun's luminosity.

History of observations
The discovery name of this star is LP 656-38, which indicates that its discovery was published between 1963 and 1981 in University of Minnesota, Minneapolis. "LP" means "Luyten, Palomar".

Gliese 3323 is known at least from 1979, when catalogues of high proper motion objects LHS and NLTT were published by Willem Jacob Luyten, and this object was included to these catalogues.

Distance measurement
In 1982, Wilhelm Gliese published photometric distance of Gliese 3323 (161 mas), and in 1991 it was included in the 3rd preliminary version of catalogue of nearby stars by Gliese and Jahreiss as NN 3323 (also designated as GJ 3323) with photometric parallax .

Its trigonometric parallax remained unknown until 2006, when it was published by RECONS team.

Planetary system
On March 15, 2017, two planets orbiting GJ 3323 were detected by the HARPS telescope, although the discovery team considers GJ 3323 c a planet candidate. The inner planet, GJ 3323b, may orbit within the circumstellar habitable zone of its star.

References

M-type main-sequence stars
Eridanus (constellation)
J05015746-0656459
3323
Planetary systems with two confirmed planets